Heidmann is a surname. Notable people with the surname include:

Frederik Heidmann (1777–1850), Norwegian military officer, civil servant, and politician
Johann Christian Friedrich Heidmann (1834–1913), German missionary and botanical collector

See also
Heilmann